Unifrance is an organization for promoting French films in France and abroad. It is managed by the Centre national du cinéma et de l'image animée. It has several hundred members who include filmmakers, directors, screenwriters and agents.

Founded in 1949, it participates in around 50 film festivals per year and was one of the ten founding members of European Film Promotion.

TV France International 
On June 23, 2021, the members of TV France International (created in 1994) voted for the absorption of TV France International by UniFrance.

References

External links
 

1949 establishments in France
Film organizations in France
Organizations established in 1949